The Singles 1986–1995 is a box set by English new wave band Duran Duran. Comprising 14 CDs, it was released on 13 September 2004 by EMI and features the singles covering the era from Notorious (1986) to Thank You (1995).

Background
This was the first time many of these tracks, including B-sides and alternate versions, appeared on CD.

While a few remixes were also absent from this collection, the most notable missing songs are four B-sides which appeared on various editions of the "Come Undone" single in 1993:

 "Falling Angel"
 "Time for Temptation"
 "Stop Dead"
 "To the Shore" (remix)

"To the Shore" originally appeared on the band's first album Duran Duran (1981), but due to the playing time limitations of vinyl records, when the album was reissued in 1983 the song was dropped in favour of the new single "Is There Something I Should Know?". The song remained unfamiliar to many who became fans only after their mainstream success in 1983 and after.

Track listing
The boxset comprises the following CD singles:

 CD 1: "Notorious" (1986)
 "Notorious" (45 Mix)
 "Winter Marches On"
 "Notorious" (Extended Mix)
 "Notorious" (Latin Rascals Mix)

 CD 2: "Skin Trade" (1987)
 "Skin Trade" (Radio Cut)
 "We Need You"
 "Skin Trade" (Stretch Mix)
 "Skin Trade" (Album version)

 CD 3: "Meet El Presidente" (1987)
 "Meet El Presidente" (7" Remix)
 "Vertigo (Do The Demolition)"
 "Meet El Presidente"
 "Meet El Presidente" (Meet El Beat)

 CD 4: "I Don't Want Your Love" (1988)
 "I Don’t Want Your Love" (Shep Pettibone 7" Mix)
 "I Don’t Want Your Love" (Album version)
 "I Don’t Want Your Love" (Big Mix)

 CD 5: "All She Wants Is" (1988)
 "All She Wants Is" (45 Mix)
 "I Believe/All I Need To Know"
 "All She Wants Is" (US Master Mix)
 "All She Wants Is" (Euro Dub Mix)
 "Skin Trade" (Parisian Mix)

 CD 6: "Do You Believe In Shame?" (1989)
 "Do You Believe In Shame?"
 "The Krush Brothers LSD Edit"
 "God (London)"
 "This Is How A Road Gets Made"
 "Palomino (Edit)"
 "Drug (Original Version)"
 "Notorious" (live – Ahoy Rotterdam 1987)

 CD 7: "Burning The Ground" (1989)
 "Burning The Ground"
 "Decadance"
 "Decadance" (2 Risk E Remix 12")

 CD 8: "Violence Of Summer" (1990) [33:47]
 "Violence Of Summer" (7" Mix) – 3:30
 "Violence Of Summer" (The Story Mix) – 3:18
 "Violence Of Summer" (Power Mix) – 4:56
 "Violence Of Summer" (Album version) – 4:20
 "Violence Of Summer" (The Rock Mix) – 4:23
 "Violence Of Summer" (The Dub Sound Of A Powerful Mix) – 4:45
 "Violence Of Summer" (Power Cutdown) – 4:01
 "Throb" – 4:25

 CD 9: "Serious" (1990) [16:27]
 "Serious (Single Version)" – 3:56
 "Yo Bad Azizi" – 3:03
 "Water Babies" – 5:35
 "All Along The Water" – 3:47

 CD 10: "Ordinary World" (1993) [36:38]
 "Ordinary World" (Single version) – 4:43
 "My Antarctica" – 5:00
 "Ordinary World" – 5:39
 "Save A Prayer" (single version) – 5:25
 "Skin Trade" – 4:25
 "The Reflex" (7" version) – 4:25
 "Hungry Like The Wolf" (130 B.P.M. version) – 3:25
 "Girls On Film" – 3:30

 CD 11: "Come Undone" (1993) [41:15]
 "Come Undone" (Edit) – 4:15
 "Ordinary World" (Acoustic version) – 5:05
 "Come Undone" (FGI Thumpin’ 12") – 8:14
 "Come Undone" (La Fin De Siecle) – 5:25
 "Come Undone" (Album version) – 4:31
 "Rio" (Album version) – 5:33
 "Is There Something I Should Know?" – 4:05
 "A View To A Kill" – 3:33

 CD 12: "Too Much Information" (1993) [60:22]
 "Too Much Information" (Album version) – 4:56
 "Come Undone" (live) – 7:35
 "Notorious" (live) – 5:31
 "Too Much Information" (Ben Chapman 12" Mix) – 6:18
 "Drowning Man" (D:Ream 12" mix) – 6:29
 "Drowning Man" (Ambient Mix) – 6:45
 "Too Much Information" (Ben Chapman Instrumental 12" Mix) – 6:00
 "Too Much Information" (Deptford Dub) – 6:01
 "Too Much Information" (Album version edit) – 3:59
 "Come Undone" (12" Mix Comin’ Together) – 7:21

 CD 13: "Perfect Day" (1995) [30:25]
 "Perfect Day" – 3:53
 "Femme Fatale" (Alternative Mix) – 4:14
 "Love Voodoo" (Remix) – 7:36
 "The Needle and the Damage Done" – 2:03
 "911 Is A Joke" (Alternate version) – 3:49
 "Make Me Smile (Come Up And See Me)" – 4:56
 "Perfect Day" (Acoustic version) – 3:44

 CD 14: "White Lines" (1995) [39.52]
 "White Lines" (Album version) – 5:26
 "Save A Prayer" (Single version) – 5:25
 "None Of The Above" (Drizabone mix) – 4:38
 "White Lines" (70's Club Mix) – 7:56
 "White Lines" (Oakland Fonk Mix) – 5:30
 "White Lines" (Junior Vasquez Mix) – 5:37
 "Ordinary World" (Acoustic version – Simon Mayo Show) – 5:16

Charts

References

2004 compilation albums
Duran Duran compilation albums
EMI Records compilation albums